St. Stephen's is a boarding and day school in the heart of Rome, located on the Aventine Hill near the Circus Maximus, Forum, and Colosseum. The school's motto is "Mens Voluntas Gratia" (Latin: "Mind, Will, Grace").

Founding 
St. Stephen's was founded in 1964 by Dr. John O. Patterson, the former Headmaster of the Kent School in Connecticut. Patterson and his team of educators selected Rome because of its rich history and proximity to some of the major moral, artistic, philosophical, and political antecedents of the Western world. Patterson intended for the school to be a haven where students from around the world could come to learn and grow together—a truly international setting. In 1975 it became the first school in Italy to adopt the International Baccalaureate.

Student Body 

There are about 250 international day students who live with their families in Rome. Many of them have parents who work for the United Nations and other international organizations. The school is home to about 50 students, who board on campus for 9 months of the year. The boarding students come from around the world, and spend holidays and summers away from the school. A small number of boarders come from the United States to complete either a semester or year abroad.

Academics 
In addition to the mandatory liberal arts curricula, the school offers additional courses in Italian, French, Spanish, Greek, German, Japanese, Portuguese, Chinese, Arabic and Latin.

University Matriculation 
Among the most popular choices of St. Stephen's alumni are Yale University, the University of Edinburgh, UCLA, and the London School of Economics.

References 

Private schools in Italy
Boarding schools in Italy
International Baccalaureate schools in Italy
International schools in Rome
Educational institutions established in 1964
1964 establishments in Italy